The 1947 Virginia State Trojans football team was an American football team that represented Virginia State College as a member of the Colored Intercollegiate Athletic Association (CIAA) during the 1947 college football season. In their 14th season under head coach Harry R. Jefferson, the team compiled an 8–1 record, finished second in the CIAA, shut out seven of nine opponents, and outscored opponents by a total of 161 to 18. The team ranked No. 7 among the nation's black college football teams according to the Pittsburgh Courier and its Dickinson Rating System.

Key players included guard General Perry, tackle Orlandus Page, and tailback John "Kimbrough" Jones.

Schedule

References

Virginia State
Virginia State Trojans football seasons
Virginia State Trojans football